Guixi is a county-level city under the jurisdiction of the prefecture-level city of Yingtan, Jiangxi Province, China, bordering Fujian Province to the southeast.

The city covers two-thirds of the land area in the municipal region. Like Yuehu District, the prefectural seat, Guixi's centre Xiongshi lies on the Xin River.

Administration
The city executive, legislature and judiciary are in Xiongshi Town, together with the CPC and PSB branches.

In the present, Guixi City has 3 subdistricts, 13 towns, 6 townships and 1 ethnic Township.

3 Subdistricts (街道, jie dao)
 Huayuan
 Xiongshi
 Dongmen

13 Towns (镇, zhen)

6 Townships (乡, xiang)

1 Ethnic Township (族乡, zu xiang)
 She Zhangping Township

Climate

Transportation

Rail
Guixi is a railroad junction for the Anhui–Jiangxi and the Zhejiang-Jiangxi Railways.

Notes and references

 
County-level divisions of Jiangxi